Eva Hög (born 4 March 1928) is a Finnish cross-country skier. She competed in the women's 10 kilometres at the 1960 Winter Olympics.

Cross-country skiing results

Olympic Games

World Championships

References

External links
 

1928 births
Living people
Finnish female cross-country skiers
Olympic cross-country skiers of Finland
Cross-country skiers at the 1960 Winter Olympics
People from Jakobstad
Sportspeople from Ostrobothnia (region)
20th-century Finnish women